Shroma is a village in the Sukhumi District in Abkhazia, Georgia. Its altitude above sea level is around 270 m. The distance to Sukhumi is 10 km.

According to the Soviet Census of 1989 Shroma was populated by 1895 inhabitants, mostly Georgians.

See also
 Sukhumi District

Sources 
 Georgian Soviet Encyclopedia, V. 11, p. 31, Tbilisi., 1987.

Notes and references

Populated places in Sukhumi District